The Federal Penitentiary Service (FSIN, Russian: Федеральная служба исполнения наказаний (ФСИН), Federalnaya Sluzhba Ispolneniya Nakazaniy) is a federal agency of the Ministry of Justice of Russia responsible for correctional services.

The FSIN is the federal authority for the detention of suspected and convicted persons, the security and maintenance of prisons in Russia, the transport of prisoners, and rehabilitation programs. As of 2019, it operates 954 prisons and pre-trial detention facilities housing adult and juvenile offenders of various security levels, with the majority of penal facilities being corrective labor colonies. Its head office is located at Zhitnaya Street 14 in Yakimanka District, Central Administrative Okrug, Moscow.

The FSIN was established in 2004 as a new federal correctional service agency for the Ministry of Justice to replace the Soviet-era Main Administration for the Execution of Punishments (Главное управление исполнения наказаний, GUIN), formerly of the Ministry of Internal Affairs, and received its current name in 2006. It claims succession from the Main Prisons Directorate of the Russian Empire founded in 1879, and directly succeeds the correctional services of the Ministry of Internal Affairs of the Soviet Union including the Gulag agency.

Arkadiy Gostev has been director since 2021.

History

The Federal Penitentiary Service is considered to be successor to the Main Prison Administration, established on 27 February 1879 as the first government body dealing with maintenance and security of detention and prison facilities in the Russian Empire. On 13 December 1895, the Main Prison Administration was transferred from the Interior Ministry to the Ministry of Justice of the Russian Empire. Following the October Revolution, a new prison administration was established by the Bolsheviks with a system composed mainly of forced labor camps across the Soviet Union. On 7 April 1930, the Gulag agency was established which oversaw an expansion of the labor camp system in the Soviet Union. In 1960, the Main Administration for Execution of Punishments (GUIN) was founded under the Ministry of Internal Affairs of the Soviet Union following the dissolution of the Gulag agency. After the dissolution of the Soviet Union in 1991, Russia maintained GUIN unchanged as part of its own Ministry of Internal Affairs until 1998, when the prison service was returned to the Ministry of Justice after nearly a century. The FSIN was established in 2004 as part of various administrative reforms occurring in Russia reforming executive bodies from 2004 to 2005, maintaining the GUIN name but specially re-created for the Ministry of Justice. In 2006, the FSIN received its current name as the Federal Service for the Execution of Punishments (Russian: Федеральная служба исполнения наказаний (ФСИН)) under the Russian Ministry of Justice. The FSIN is commonly known in English as the Federal Penitentiary Service.

Main tasks and authorities

The main tasks of the FSIN are:
 the execution, in accordance with Russian legislation penal, detention of persons suspected or accused of committing crimes, and defendants;
 control the behavior of probationers and prisoners, which the court granted a deferment sentence;
 ensuring the protection of the rights, freedoms and legitimate interests of convicts and persons in custody;
 ensuring law and order in the institutions, enforcing criminal penalties of imprisonment (hereinafter - institutions executing punishment), and in detention centers, security contained in them convicts, persons in custody, as well as employees of the correctional system, officials and citizens in the territories of these institutions and detention facilities;
 protecting and escorting prisoners and persons detained on the specified routes escort, convoy of Russian citizens and stateless persons on the territory of the Russian Federation, as well as foreign citizens and stateless persons in the case of their extradition;
 a prisoners and detainees in detention, detention conditions, in accordance with international law, provisions of international treaties and federal laws;
 The organization of the activities to provide assistance to convicted in social adaptation;
 management of the territorial bodies of the FSIN directly subordinate agencies.
 The FSIN Diggers use the Metro-2, when they need to transfer high-risk prisoners.

Management

The FSIN is headed by the Director of the Federal Penitentiary Service, who is appointed and dismissed by the President of Russia on the recommendation of the Prime Minister of Russia. The Director is authorized to have six deputies, including one first deputy, who are appointed and dismissed by the President.

Directors
 Yuri Kalinin (2004-2009)
 Alexander Reimer (2009-2012) - appointed by President Dmitry Medvedev, the first to head the federal prison system without previous service.  
 Gennady Kornienko (2012–present) - appointed by President Vladimir Putin.

Population

As of March 2019, the FSIN is responsible for 558,778 inmates, including pre-trial detainees. Only 8% of prisoners in Russia are female, and 0.2% are juvenile offenders. Russia has one of the highest incarceration rates in the world at 416 per 100,000 people in 2018, with a prison population ranked fourth behind the United States, China, and Brazil. Russia was previously ranked as having the highest incarceration rate per 100,000 people internationally until it was overtaken by the United States in 2000. However, the prison population in Russia dropped substantially between 2000 to 2018 with a decline of over 400,000 inmates, thanks among other factors, to the socioeconomic reforms and overall increase in standards and quality of life.

The FSNI operates 705 places of worship within its facilities for inmates of various faiths including Orthodoxy, Islam, Buddhism, and Catholicism. In 2007, Rabbi Aharon Gurevich was appointed the chief military rabbi, the first time to hold this position in Russia since 1917. Rabbi Gurevich has served as the chief rabbi for Jewish inmates and officers in Russian federal prison system.

Facilities

As of 2019, the FSIN operates 954 facilities of various types located across Russia. The majority of prisons are "corrective labor colonies", a type of penal colony that combines detention with compulsory work introduced during the Soviet era, but also operates a number of traditional prisons.

The FSIN has eight special correctional facilities only for prisoners serving life sentences and those formerly sentenced to death:

Also a number of federal penal colonies:

Special purpose units 

Every regional office of Federal Penitentiary Service has its own special purpose unit, whose tasks include rescuing the hostages, providing security during transportation of prisoners, anti-riot tasks in penitentiary facilities etc. The special purpose unit of FSIN's Moscow department is called Saturn. Most of FSIN special purpose units were involved in special tasks during both Chechen Wars and their aftermath.

Notes

References

External links

 
Official Community VKontakte 

Prison and correctional agencies
Penal system in Russia
1879 establishments in the Russian Empire